Ulysses Gomez (Los Angeles, May 25, 1983) is an American mixed martial artist who competes in the flyweight and bantamweight divisions. A professional MMA competitor since 2007, Gomez has mostly fought in PFC and Tachi Palace Fights and is also known for his grappling career.

Early life
Gomez was born in Los Angeles, California to two Mexican-Americans. He is the brother of soccer player and U.S. national team representative Herculez Gomez. Before his fights, Ulysses has worn the shirt of the club that his brother plays for. This has included the Kansas City Wizards and Club Puebla.

Mixed martial arts career

Background

Gomez has been training with Marc Laimon since he was in high school. Gomez' high school wrestling coach was UFC veteran and Nova União black belt Tony DeSouza. In 2004, Gomez helped Laimon found the Cobra Kai Academy in Las Vegas, Nevada, where he trained and taught the children's class. Since Marc Laimons move to Texas in 2010, Gomez is now training under Laimon's 1st Blackbelt and now owner of Cobra Kai, Simpson Go.

Early career
Gomez began his career in PFC, in Lemoore, California. Gomez quickly amassed a record of 2–0, both via submission. Gomez then fought Thai Rambaa Somdet and lost via unanimous decision.

In his final fight for the Palace Fights Championship, Gomez defeated David Suarez.

Gomez then joined Tachi Palace Fights and competed in their first event, against Martin Sandoval.

In his second appearance for Tachi Palace Fights, Gomez defeated Chino Nicholas via technical submission (standing guillotine choke), when Nicholas refused to tap and passed out.

Gomez fought Luis Gonzalez for the inaugural Tachi Palace Fights Flyweight Championship at TPF 4: Cinco de Mayhem. Gomez defeated Gonzalez to take the title, but then immediately announced his signing with Bellator, in addition to his move in weight class. The fight was closely fought and Gomez' decision victory over Gonzalez was heavily booed by the crowd.

Bellator Fighting Championships
In May 2010, Gomez signed with Bellator Fighting Championships and moved up a weight class, to compete in their upcoming bantamweight tournament in their third season.

In his opening round fight, at Bellator 27, Gomez faced Travis Reddinger, which Gomez won via split decision. Gomez would have faced Zach Makovsky in the semi-final; however, Gomez had to withdraw with a staph infection.

Ultimate Fighting Championship
Gomez made his promotional debut against John Moraga on August 4, 2012 at UFC on Fox: Shogun vs. Vera. He lost the fight via KO in the first round.

Gomez next faced Phil Harris on February 16, 2013 at UFC on Fuel TV: Barão vs. McDonald. Gomez lost the fight by unanimous decision and was subsequently released from the promotion.

Post-UFC career
Gomez faced Abel Cullum	at RFA 18: Manzanares vs. Pantoja on September 12, 2014, in his first fight post-UFC release. He lost the fight by a first-round submission.

Mixed martial arts record

|-
| Loss
| align=center| 9–5
| Abel Cullum
| Submission (guillotine choke)
| RFA 18: Manzanares vs. Pantoja
| 
| align=center| 1
| align=center| 1:29
| Albuquerque, New Mexico, United States
| 
|-
| Loss
| align=center| 9–4
| Phil Harris
| Decision (unanimous)
| UFC on Fuel TV: Barão vs. McDonald
| 
| align=center| 3
| align=center| 5:00
| London, England
| 
|-
| Loss
| align=center| 9–3
| John Moraga
| KO (elbows and punches)
| UFC on Fox: Shogun vs. Vera
| 
| align=center| 1
| align=center| 3:46
| Los Angeles, California, United States
| 
|-
| Win
| align=center| 9–2
| Cody Gibson
| Submission (guillotine choke)
| TPF 11: Redemption
| 
| align=center| 3
| align=center| 2:36
| Lemoore, California, United States
| 
|-
| Win
| align=center| 8–2
| Drew Bittner
| Submission (rear-naked choke)
| TPF 10: Let The Chips Fall
| 
| align=center| 2
| align=center| 1:21
| Lemoore, California, United States
| 
|-
| Loss
| align=center| 7–2
| Darrell Montague
| Decision (unanimous)
| TPF 8: All or Nothing
| 
| align=center| 5
| align=center| 5:00
| Lemoore, California, United States
| 
|-
| Win
| align=center| 7–1
| Travis Reddinger
| Decision (split)
| Bellator 27
| 
| align=center| 3
| align=center| 5:00
| San Antonio, Texas, United States
| 
|-
| Win
| align=center| 6–1
| Luis Gonzalez
| Decision (unanimous)
| TPF 4: Cinco de Mayhem
| 
| align=center| 5
| align=center| 5:00
| Lemoore, California, United States
| 
|-
| Win
| align=center| 5–1
| Chino Nicolas
| Submission (guillotine choke)
| TPF 2: Brawl in the Hall
| 
| align=center| 1
| align=center| 4:31
| Lemoore, California, United States
| 
|-
| Win
| align=center| 4–1
| Martin Sandoval
| Submission (rear-naked choke)
| TPF 1: Tachi Palace Fights 1
| 
| align=center| 2
| align=center| 0:36
| Lemoore, California, United States
| 
|-
| Win
| align=center| 3–1
| David Suarez
| Submission (rear-naked choke)
| PFC: Best of Both Worlds
| 
| align=center| 1
| align=center| 1:45
| Lemoore, California, United States
| 
|-
| Loss
| align=center| 2–1
| Rambaa Somdet
| Decision (unanimous)
| PFC 11: All In
| 
| align=center| 3
| align=center| 3:00
| Lemoore, California, United States
| 
|-
| Win
| align=center| 2–0
| Hector Sandoval
| Submission (armbar)
| PFC 9: The Return
| 
| align=center| 1
| align=center| 0:51
| Lemoore, California, United States
| 
|-
| Win
| align=center| 1–0
| Greg McDowell
| Submission (choke)
| PFC 7: Palace Fighting Championship 7
| 
| align=center| 1
| align=center| 0:41
| Lemoore, California, United States
|

Grappling career

Gomez is a highly accomplished grappler, having won multiple awards and competitions. These include being ranked top of his weight class in Grapplers Quest. Gomez also competed in Pancrase. Gomez began as a beginner, entering himself into pro divisions and "began submitting black belts shortly after receiving his blue belt"

Gomez then main evented the opening day of the inaugural UFC Fan Expo in a Grapplers Quest exhibition match against Shooto tournament winner and 40-fight MMA veteran Rumina Sato; a natural featherweight. Gomez was defeated by submission (armbar).

References

External links

1983 births
Living people
American male mixed martial artists
Mixed martial artists from California
American mixed martial artists of Mexican descent
Flyweight mixed martial artists
Bantamweight mixed martial artists
Mixed martial artists utilizing Brazilian jiu-jitsu
Ultimate Fighting Championship male fighters
American practitioners of Brazilian jiu-jitsu